Marie Frencheska Mae Tobias Farr-Jose (born September 9, 1992) is a Filipino-British singer, model and actress. She was the Are You the Next Big Star? grand champion along with Geoff Taylor.

Early life and career
Farr was born in Pasay City, Philippines. She graduated from St. Paul College of Parañaque.
 Her father is of British descent.

She was named the Next Female Big Star along with Geoff Taylor as the Next Male Big Star on the television show "Are You the Next Big Star?". Along with winning the contest, they each received one million pesos (P1,000,000), a condominium unit from Avida, a management contract from GMA Artist Center and a recording contract from GMA Records. After winning Are You the Next Big Star?, she started in various television guestings and shows. She guested at the christmaserye of GMA Network, Sana Ngayong Pasko. She was also included in the defunct SOP. She also became a part of the BandaOke wherein she was included in the BandaOke band along with her co-Are You the Next Big Star? batchmates, Geoff Taylor and Jay Perillo. In the movie industry, Farr bested other actresses as she wins the lead role in the Filipino musical movie, Emir. Farr is currently seen in the new musical variety show of GMA Network, Party Pilipinas.
On September 6, 2015 Frencheska Farr is also joining to the new Sunday musical program Sunday Central Club with the divas Rachelle Ann Go, Jaya, La Diva, Julie Anne San Jose & Kyla. On January 4, 2016 Frencheska joins the program Dinggin Mo Oh Dios with Reymond Sajor, Rachelle Ann Go, Jonalyn Viray & Aicelle Santos for the program. On February 21, 2016 Frencheska Farr made a 4th interpretur winner of Sunday Central Club Battle of the Champions.

Filmography

Television

Films

Studio album

Awards and achievements

Television and film theme songs
 Sabihin Mo Sa Akin – (SRO Cinemaserye: Ganti Theme Song)
 Hulog ng Langit – with Geoff Taylor (Langit sa Piling Mo Theme Song)
 Reunions – Reunions Theme Song
 Everytime Reel Love Presents: Tween Hearts Theme Song
 Ang Pag-ibig Kong Ito – Temptation of Wife Theme Song
 Sa Pangarap ko – Alakdana Theme Song
 Suddenly It's Magic – My Valentine Girls Theme Song
 Isama Mo Ako – Captain Barbell Love Theme Song
 Alice Bungisngis – Alice Bungisngis and her Wonder Walis Theme Song
 Inside My Heart – Moon Embracing the Sun Theme Song
 Ang Tanging Sinta – Alamat ng Dama de Noche Theme Song
 Kape at Balita – with Frank Magalona (Kape at Balita Theme Song)

References

External links
 
 Frencheska Farr on iGMA.tv

1992 births
Filipino female models
21st-century Filipino women singers
Filipino people of British descent
Reality show winners
Living people
People from Las Piñas
Actresses from Metro Manila
Singers from Metro Manila
21st-century Filipino actresses
Participants in Philippine reality television series
De La Salle–College of Saint Benilde alumni
GMA Network personalities
GMA Music artists